Andrey Zhelyazkov (born 9 July 1952 in Radnevo) is a former Bulgarian footballer who played as a forward. He spent 12 years of his career playing for Slavia Sofia and is the club's all-time top goalscorer in the A Group with 136 goals. Zhelyazkov is also the most capped player in the history of the club with 338 league appearances. He participated in the 1986 FIFA World Cup.

Career
Zhelyazkov played in his home country for Minyor Radnevo and Slavia Sofia, in the Netherlands for Feyenoord, in France with RC Strasbourg, in Belgium for Beerschot, and for the Bulgaria national football team. With Slavia he won the Bulgarian Cup in 1975 and 1980 and reached the final twice more in 1972 and 1981. He hold Slavia's record for both most caps with 338 and most goals 136.

Feyenoord
In 1981, Zhelyazkov joined Eredivisie side Feyenoord. During 1983–84 season he formed a successful partnership with Johan Cruijff and Ruud Gullit, which led Feyenoord to the first league title since 1974. They contributed a total of 34 goals in the campaign.

Honours

Club
Slavia Sofia
 Bulgarian Cup (2): 1975, 1980

Feyenoord
 Eredivisie: 1983–84
 KNVB Cup: 1983–84

Individual
 Bulgarian Footballer of the Year: 1980

References

External links

1952 births
Living people
Bulgarian footballers
Bulgaria international footballers
Association football forwards
PFC Slavia Sofia players
Feyenoord players
RC Strasbourg Alsace players
First Professional Football League (Bulgaria) players
Ligue 1 players
Eredivisie players
1986 FIFA World Cup players
Bulgarian expatriate footballers
Expatriate footballers in the Netherlands
Bulgarian expatriate sportspeople in the Netherlands
Expatriate footballers in France
Bulgarian expatriate sportspeople in France
Expatriate footballers in Belgium
Bulgarian expatriate sportspeople in Belgium
Bulgarian football managers
PFC Levski Sofia managers
People from Radnevo